Richard Godolphin Long (2 October 1761 – 1 July 1835) was an English banker and Tory politician.

Life and career
Baptised at West Lavington, Wiltshire a month after his birth, he was the son of Richard Long (d. 1787) and his wife Meliora, descendant of Sir John Lambe.

By 1800, Long was a partner in the Melksham Bank, together with his younger brother John Long, John Awdry and Thomas Bruges. In 1799, he purchased Steeple Ashton Manor House and farm, which remained in the family until 1967, and commissioned architect Jeffry Wyattville to build Rood Ashton House nearby in 1808.

He was appointed High Sheriff of Wiltshire for 1794. Long entered the House of Commons in 1806, sitting for Wiltshire until 1818. He was the founder of the Royal Wiltshire Yeomanry.

Family
On 28 March 1786, he married Florentina Wrey, third daughter of Sir Bourchier Wrey, 6th Baronet, and had by her four daughters and two sons. After a lingering illness Long died aged 73, at Rood Ashton House, six weeks after his wife, and was interred in the family's crypt at St Mary's Church, Steeple Ashton. Their children included:

 Walter (1793–1867), the eldest son, was also a member of parliament, representing North Wiltshire
 Ellen, the eldest daughter, married John Walmesley in 1812; their children included Richard Walmesley (1816–1893), a lawyer and latterly owner of Lucknam Park, Wiltshire
 Florentina (Flora), having been previously engaged to Henry Cobbe (uncle of Frances Power Cobbe), who had died the day before the proposed marriage, formed a strong attachment to the then-elderly poet George Crabbe. Flora and her aunts were frequent visitors of novelist Jane Austen, who referred to Flora as her 'cousin', though their exact relationship is not known. Austen never met Crabbe, but nursed a fantasy of becoming his wife.

Notes

Further reading 
 Inheriting the Earth: The Long Family's 500 Year Reign in Wiltshire; Cheryl Nicol

External links 

1761 births
1835 deaths
High Sheriffs of Wiltshire
Richard Godolphin
Members of the Parliament of the United Kingdom for Wiltshire
Tory MPs (pre-1834)
UK MPs 1806–1807
UK MPs 1807–1812
UK MPs 1812–1818
Royal Wiltshire Yeomanry officers